Harold Pratt  may refer to:

Bob Pratt (1912-2001), born Harold Pratt, Australian rules footballer
Harold I. Pratt (1877-1939), American oil industrialist and philanthropist
Harold Douglas Pratt Jr. (born 1944), American ornithologist

See also
Harold Pratt House, New York City
Harry Pratt (disambiguation)